Zachary Edward Martin (born November 20, 1990) is an American football offensive guard for the Dallas Cowboys of the National Football League (NFL). He played college football at Notre Dame and was drafted 16th overall by the Cowboys in the first round of the 2014 NFL Draft. He has made eight Pro Bowls and been selected to eight All-Pro teams. Martin is considered one of the best guards in the NFL.

Early years

Zack and his brother Nick, spent their entire elementary years from kindergarten through eighth grade at Saint Matthew Catholic School, in Indianapolis, Indiana, according to their then principal, Dr. Martin Erlenbaugh. The Martins are products of Catholic Youth Organization (CYO) sports in the Archdiocese of Indianapolis. Zack and Nick each enrolled their freshman year at Bishop Chatard High School in Indianapolis, Indiana. Zack tallied 114 pancake blocks during his senior campaign, and was named a first-team all-state selection as a senior and junior. He was a member of the Indiana Class 3A State Championship team as 
a sophomore with a 12–3 record, and helped lead his high school team to a 14–1 record and second consecutive Indiana Class 3A state championship as a junior in 2007.

He started both ways as a sophomore on the offensive and defensive lines, and recorded 73 tackles, including five tackles for loss as a defensive tackle during his sophomore season in 2006. He also starred in basketball during his sophomore and junior years at Bishop Chatard. His style of play earned him the nickname "The Butcher", given to him by opposing fans. He was selected to play in the 2009 Under Armour All-America Game in Orlando, Florida. He also competed in track & field as a shot putter and discus thrower. He played for legendary coach Andrew Slome.

Considered a four-star recruit by Rivals.com, he was rated the 22nd best offensive tackle in the nation. He accepted a scholarship from Notre Dame over offers from Indiana, Kentucky, and Michigan.

College career
After redshirting in 2009, he became the starting left tackle for the Irish in 2010. He saw action in all 13 games in 2010, and was one of 11 players to start all 13 games for the Irish that season. As a junior in 2011, he started all 13 games at left offensive tackle, and was part of a unit that only allowed 17 sacks during the season. He helped pave the way for a running game that averaged 4.8 yards a carry, the best by a Notre Dame team since 1996. In 2012, he was named one of four team captains for the Irish. He started all 13 games and helped lead the team to a 12–0 regular season record and a trip to the 2013 BCS National Championship Game against the Alabama Crimson Tide, but lost 42–14. He announced he would return to the Irish for the 2013–2014 season.

In his final season, he was named team captain for the second time, becoming only the 18th player in school history to earn such an honor. Martin would start all 13 games, setting a new school record for career starts by an offensive lineman with 52. He was leader of a unit that allowed only 8 sacks, tied for second best in the FBS. He was named MVP of the 2013 Pinstripe Bowl after a 29–16 win over Rutgers, becoming the first offensive lineman since 1959 (Jay Huffman) to receive that distinction in a college bowl game.

Professional career

2014 season
In the 2014 NFL Draft, there was speculation that the Dallas Cowboys would select quarterback Johnny Manziel if he was available. Instead, the team had targeted linebacker Ryan Shazier, who ended up going to the Pittsburgh Steelers. With the 16th pick of the first round the Cowboys drafted Martin with the intention of converting him to an offensive guard.

He was named the starter at right guard from the first day of Organized Team Activities in the preseason, replacing Mackenzy Bernadeau, who had been the starter in the previous two years. His addition contributed to the offensive line becoming arguably the best in the league.

On December 23, Martin became one of four rookies selected to the 2014 Pro Bowl. On January 2, 2014 he was voted to the AP 2014 All-Pro Team, the only rookie to make the team, and was the first Cowboys rookie since running back Calvin Hill was named to the team in 1969. Also, he was the first rookie offensive lineman to be named first-team AP All-Pro since Dick Huffman in 1947.

2015 season
Martin had a second All-Pro caliber season in as many years despite losing DeMarco Murray to the division rivals Philadelphia Eagles in free agency. Martin and company led the NFL's ninth best rushing attack as teammate Darren McFadden finished fourth in rushing with 1,089 yards. Martin played for Team Irvin along with each of his elected teammates in the 2016 Pro Bowl and was named second team All-Pro by the Associated Press.

2016 season
Martin was named to his third straight Pro Bowl and was named First-team All-Pro, both honors being shared with fellow Cowboy offensive linemen Travis Frederick and Tyron Smith. He was also ranked 58th on the NFL Top 100 Players of 2017.

2017 season

On April 18, 2017, the Cowboys picked up the fifth-year option on Martin's rookie contract. He was named to his fourth straight Pro Bowl alongside tackle Tyron Smith and center Travis Frederick for the fourth straight year. He was ranked 71st by his peers on the NFL Top 100 Players of 2018.

2018 season
On June 13, 2018, Martin signed a six-year, $84 million contract extension with the Cowboys with $40 million guaranteed, making him the highest paid guard in the NFL. He suffered a knee injury in Week 14 and missed the following week, the first time in his career that he had missed a game.

2019 season 
In 2019 Martin become one of five offensive linemen ever to secure a Pro Bowl invitation in each of their first six seasons, joining Lou Creekmur (1950–57), Jon Morris (1964–70), Joe Thomas (2007–16) and Richmond Webb (1990–96).

2020 season
In Week 11, Martin made his first career start at right tackle due to injuries across the offensive line. On December 7, 2020, Martin was placed on injured reserve with a calf strain. He was activated on January 2, 2021.

2021 season
On September 5, 2021, it was announced that Martin was ruled out for the 2021 season opener due to testing positive for COVID-19.

Personal life
Martin married his wife Morgan in July 2016 and has a son and a daughter. His wife is the sister of former NFL tight end Tyler Eifert. Before becoming brothers-in-law, Martin and Eifert were teammates and roommates at the University of Notre Dame. Martin's brother Nick is also an NFL center. He also played college football at Notre Dame and was drafted by the Houston Texans in the second round of the 2016 NFL Draft.

References

External links
Notre Dame Fighting Irish bio
Dallas Cowboys bio

1990 births
Living people
American football offensive guards
American football offensive tackles
Dallas Cowboys players
National Conference Pro Bowl players
Notre Dame Fighting Irish football players
Players of American football from Indianapolis
Unconferenced Pro Bowl players
Under Armour All-American football players
Ed Block Courage Award recipients